Leandro Rosa Souza (born February 24, 1986 in Rio de Janeiro), is a Brazilian central defender. He currently plays for Santo André.

Honours
Avaí
 Campeonato Catarinense: 2009

Santa Cruz
Campeonato Pernambucano: 2011, 2012
Campeonato Brasileiro Série C: 2013

CSA
Campeonato Brasileiro Série C: 2017

External links
 sambafoot
 CBF
 websoccerclub

References

1986 births
Living people
Brazilian footballers
Association football defenders
Campeonato Brasileiro Série A players
Campeonato Brasileiro Série B players
Campeonato Brasileiro Série C players
Campeonato Brasileiro Série D players
Joinville Esporte Clube players
Club Athletico Paranaense players
Avaí FC players
Bangu Atlético Clube players
Santa Cruz Futebol Clube players
Guarani FC players
Associação Desportiva Cabofriense players
Agremiação Sportiva Arapiraquense players
Centro Sportivo Alagoano players
Footballers from Rio de Janeiro (city)